Jalkanen is a Finnish surname. Notable people with the surname include:

Kustaa Jalkanen (1862–1921), Finnish farmer and politician
Kalle Jalkanen (1907-1941) - a Finnish cross-country skier who won a gold medal at the 1936 Winter Olympics
Kauko Jalkanen (1918–2007), Finnish fencer
Timo Jalkanen (born 1936), Finnish diplomat and jurist
Kari Tapio (1945-2010; birth name Kari Tapani Jalkanen) - a Finnish schlager-singer & one of the most popular singers in Finland for decades.
Markku Jalkanen (born 1954), Finnish scientist, biotech entrepreneur and businessman
Sirpa Jalkanen (born 1954), Finnish scientist, working in the field of biomedical and clinical medicine
Karl James Jalkanen, PhD (Chassell, Michigan, 1958-) is a researcher in Molecular Biophysics at the Technical University of Denmark in the Department of Micro- and Nanotechnology

Ilja Jalkanen, a vocalist for Kiuas, a heavy metal band from Espoo, Finland.

Meaning
The prefix Jalka generally means "foot," but also can refer to the leg of a stool or an animal's paw. Jalka- thus has a loose meaning, and when the prefix is added to the common -nen Finnish name ending it loses its colloquial meaning. Like most Finnish names, whether Jalkanen has a formal meaning is ambiguous. Generally, Finnish surnames do not have the same meaning schemes as other European names. If Finnish names were used to indicate a family's original trade (as with English and German names, like Miller, Shoemaker, Brewer, Smith, etc.) then the term "foot" or "Jalka" could refer to a profession such as a cobbler or tracker.

Finnish-language surnames